Amisan (아미산) is a mountain of Dangjin, Chungcheongnam-do, South Korea.

See also
List of mountains of Korea

References

Dangjin
Mountains of South Chungcheong Province
Mountains of South Korea